Antietam Hall is a historic home located in Hagerstown, Washington County, Maryland, United States. It is a two-story, partially Flemish bond brick dwelling, set on a low limestone foundation. The house has a slate roof and four chimneys. The property includes a large barn and other outbuildings, including a -story four-bay brick secondary dwelling.

Antietam Hall was listed on the National Register of Historic Places in 1979.

References

External links
, including photo in 1973, at Maryland Historical Trust

Houses on the National Register of Historic Places in Maryland
Houses in Hagerstown, Maryland
National Register of Historic Places in Washington County, Maryland